The 1998–99 season was the 53rd season in FK Partizan's existence. This article shows player statistics and matches that the club played during the 1998–99 season.

Players

Squad information

Competitions

First League of FR Yugoslavia

The championship was stopped on 14 May 1999, because of the NATO bombing of Yugoslavia, after 24 rounds.

FR Yugoslavia Cup

Cup Winners' Cup

Qualifying round

First round

Second round

See also
 List of FK Partizan seasons
List of unbeaten football club seasons

References

External links
 Official website
 Partizanopedia 1998-99  (in Serbian)

FK Partizan seasons
Partizan
Serbian football championship-winning seasons